The 1969 Auburn Tigers football team represented Auburn University in the 1969 NCAA University Division football season. It was the Tigers' 78th overall and 36th season as a member of the Southeastern Conference (SEC). The team was led by head coach Ralph Jordan, in his 19th year, and played their home games at Cliff Hare Stadium in Auburn, Alabama. They finished with a record of eight wins and three losses (8–3 overall, 5–2 in the SEC) and with a loss against Houston in the Astro-Bluebonnet Bowl.

Schedule

Source: 1969 Auburn football schedule

Personnel

Game summaries

Clemson

Alabama

    
    
    
    
    
    
    
    
    
    
    
    

Auburn's first win versus Alabama since 1963.

Stats

Passing
Pat Sullivan 123/257, 1686 yards, 16 TD, 16 INT

Rushing
Pat Sullivan 205 yards

Receiving
Terry Beasley 34 receptions, 610 yards (LG: 42), 6 TD

Defense
Buddy McClinton 9 INT (school record), 92 yards (LG: 24) 
Larry Willingham 7 INT, 85 yards
Don Webb 4 INT, 48 yards (LG: 24)

Awards
All-Americans: S Buddy McClinton
All-SEC: C Tom Banks, LB Mike Kolen, S Buddy McClinton, PK John Riley
Cliff Hare Award: Al Griffin

References

Auburn
Auburn Tigers football seasons
Auburn Tigers football